Suining railway station is a railway station in Suining County, Xuzhou, Jiangsu, China. It is an intermediate stop on the Xuzhou–Yancheng high-speed railway and was opened with the line on 16 December 2019. It has a station building with a waiting room, two side platforms, and two through lines without platforms.

On 15 April 2022, the station was closed in an attempt to reduce the spread of coronavirus. It was reopened on 5 June.

References 

Railway stations in Jiangsu
Railway stations in China opened in 2019